Ashly Stohl (born August 9, 1972) is an American photographer based in Los Angeles and New York City. She is the Publisher of Peanut Press, which she co-founded with photographer David Carol in 2014, and the author of numerous photography books.

Biography
Stohl grew up in Los Angeles and attended UC Santa Barbara, where she earned a BS in chemistry. Prior to becoming a photographer, she designed award-winning educational websites for NASA's Mars Exploration Program.

Stohl is a self-taught photographer whose work documents her family and their relationships with each other. Her first book, Charth Vader, published in 2014, portrays the struggles of her youngest son as he navigates the world with a visual impairment.  The profits from the book were donated to the Vision Center at Children's Hospital Los Angeles. Her second book, Days & Years, includes photographs of all three of her children and was published in 2019 in conjunction with her solo show at the Leica Gallery in SoHo. Stohl has lectured at various institutions such as Columbia University, George Washington University, SPE National, and the Penumbra Foundation.

Books
Charth Vader. Los Angeles, CA: Peanut Press, 2014.
Days & Years. Los Angeles, CA: Peanut Press, 2019. With an introduction by Lynn Melnick.

Collections
Stohl's work is held in multiple institutions' libraries and photography collections, including:
International Center for Photography
Museum of Fine Arts, Boston
Virginia Museum of Fine Arts
Cleveland Museum of Art
Yale University
Emory University
Washington University in St. Louis
University of Victoria
College of William & Mary

References

External links

Peanut Press

American photographers
1972 births
Living people